P. maculata may refer to:

 Panorpodes maculata, a jewel beetle
 Paragorgopis maculata, a picture-winged fly
 Paralopostega maculata, a moth endemic to Hawaii
 Parapercis maculata, a ray-finned fish
 Parasiccia maculata, an Asian moth
 Parasikukia maculata, a fish endemic to Thailand
 Parias maculata, a venomous pitviper
 Parochetus maculata, a plant with blue flowers
 Paropsis maculata, a tortoise beetle
 Paroreomyza maculata, a bird endemic to Oahu
 Pegomya maculata, a calyptrate muscoid
 Pempelia maculata, a snout moth
 Penicillaria maculata, an owlet moth
 Pentila maculata, an African butterfly
 Percina maculata, a roughbelly darter
 Peristeria maculata, a New World orchid
 Persicaria maculata, an annual plant
 Persicula maculata, a sea snail
 Phlox maculata, a flowering plant
 Phycodes maculata, an Indian moth
 Phyllonorycter maculata, a Japanese moth
 Phymata maculata, an ambush bug
 Pinctada maculata, a pearl oyster
 Pionycha maculata, a ground beetle
 Piruna maculata, a skipper butterfly
 Planaria maculata, a planariid triclad
 Planigale maculata, a marsupial mouse
 Platnickina maculata, a tangle-web spider
 Platysticta maculata, a closed wing damselfly
 Platythelphusa maculata, a freshwater crab
 Pleione maculata, a Himalayan crocus
 Pleurobranchaea maculata, a side-gill slug
 Pleurothallis maculata, a tropical orchid
 Polycarpa maculata, a tunicate with a folded pharyngeal basket
 Polyortha maculata, an Ecuadorean moth
 Polystachya maculata, an orchid endemic to Burundi
 Pomacea maculata, an apple snail
 Ponthieva maculata, a New World orchid
 Porcellana maculata, a porcelain crab
 Portevinia maculata, a European hoverfly
 Posterobranchaea maculata, a headshield slug
 Potentilla maculata, a herbaceous plant
 Potiaete maculata, a longhorn beetle
 Procapperia maculata, an Old World moth
 Prosartes maculata, a perennial plant
 Protolychnis maculata, a long-horned moth
 Psathyrella maculata, a dark-spored agaric
 Pseudacris maculata, a chorus frog
 Pseudaneitea maculata, a leaf-veined slug
 Pseudofentonia maculata, an owlet moth
 Pseudomantis maculata, a praying mantis
 Pseudomonnea maculata, a ground beetle
 Pseudostomatella maculata, a sea snail
 Psiloptera maculata, a jewel beetle
 Pterocalla maculata, a picture-winged fly
 Puya maculata, a plant endemic to Ecuador
 Pyrrhalta maculata, a leaf beetle